Double-system recording is a form of sound recording used in motion picture production whereby the sound for a scene is recorded on a machine that is separate from the camera or picture-recording apparatus.

Double-system recording is the standard procedure on motion pictures that are originally photographed on film.  Recording sound-on-film directly at the time of photography has several technical limitations, and no professional motion picture camera supports this option, so all production sound is recorded on a separate recorder.  This procedure requires that both camera and sound recorder share a very accurate time reference, and that the speed of the camera and sound recorders be carefully governed.  Originally this was done with an electro-mechanical interlock between the camera and recorder, necessitating a physical link, a cable, between recorder and camera.  As quartz-based timers came into common use, film cameras and sound recorders adopted these, and these were accurate enough to remove the need for an interlock cable.

Double-system recording requires that sound and picture be manually synchronized at the start of every "take" or camera run.  This task was performed by the clapper slate.  A clap sound on the recording is matched to the closed clapper image on the printed film, and thus the two recordings can be realigned into sync.

Before magnetic recording, a double-system sound recorder was generally a phonograph lathe.  Once magnetic recording became viable, a succession of magnetic sound recorders, culminating in the Nagra, were the standard.  As of 2007, most double-system production sound is recorded with hard disk drive-based  digital recorders, with a DAT backup.

When the apparatus recording sound and image are the same, as in a video tape recorder, sound is recorded directly onto the picture medium, and this procedure is called 'single-system recording'.  On feature films that are photographed on high-definition video, audio is often recorded on the video recorder and also on secondary recorder.

See also
 Single-system recording
ADAT
Digital Audio Stationary Head
Digital Data Storage (DDS)
Magnetic storage
Magnetic tape
Magnetic tape sound recording
PCM adaptor
ProDigi

References 

soundonsound.com  A Practical Guide To Working With Pictures, Part 3,Tips & Tricks, Published August 2000.
thefreedictionary.com sepmag
History of Telecine at the BBC, 1994
youtube.com Magna Tech 10036-3 Film Sound Follower Recorder Player.
Sondor web site
 Post Magazine Arri partners with Sondor, September 11, 2010
Summertone on Sondor
Magna Tech 10036-3 Film Sound Follower Recorder Player
Film into video: a guide to merging the technologies by 
 Nagra website
 Nagra IIC tape recorder held at the British Library
 History of Nagra recorders
 photographs of Nagra recorders Stuart Blake Jones, Richard H. Kallenberger, George D. Cvjetnicanin
Synclavier history

Film production
Film and video technology
Film editing